Disculella madeirensis is a species of air-breathing land snails, terrestrial pulmonate gastropod mollusks in the family Geomitridae, the hairy snails and their allies. This species is endemic to Madeira, Portugal.

References

Molluscs of Madeira
Disculella
Gastropods described in 1828
Taxonomy articles created by Polbot